Ryan Harper may refer to:

 Ryan Harper (footballer)  (born 1987), Scottish footballer
 Ryan Harper (chess player) (born 1977), chess player from Trinidad and Tobago